Dorcadion angorense is a species of beetle in the family Cerambycidae. It was described by Ludwig Ganglbauer in 1897. It is known from Turkey.

References

angorense
Beetles described in 1897